Three Japanese destroyers have been named :

See also 
 Murakumo (disambiguation)

Imperial Japanese Navy ship names
Japanese Navy ship names